George Davies (born November 19, 1940) is an American retired pole vaulter and a former world record holder. He set his record on May 20, 1961, in Boulder, Colorado, jumping . He was the first pole vaulter to break a world record with a fiberglass pole.

References 

1940 births
American male pole vaulters
World record setters in athletics (track and field)
Living people
Place of birth missing (living people)